World Marriage Day is an observance sponsored by American organization Worldwide Marriage Encounter,  associated with the Catholic Marriage Encounter movement  and observed on second Sunday of February each year.

Its purpose is declared to be: "World Marriage Day honors husband and wife as the foundation of the family, the basic unit of society. It salutes the beauty of their faithfulness, sacrifice and joy in daily married life."

See also 
 Familialism
 Marriage

References 

February observances
Love
Marriage